James August Smith (1841–1928) was a Roman Catholic bishop who served as the Archbishop of St. Andrews and Edinburgh in Scotland from 1900 to 1928.

Born in Edinburgh on 18 October 1841, he was ordained a priest on 31 March 1866. He was appointed the Bishop of Dunkeld by the Holy See on 14 August 1890, and consecrated to the Episcopate on 28 October 1890. The principal consecrator was Archbishop William Smith, and the principal co-consecrators were Bishop John McLachlan and Bishop (later Archbishop) Angus MacDonald. He was translated to the Archdiocese of St. Andrews and Edinburgh as archbishop on 30 August 1900. He died in office on 25 November 1928, aged 87.

References

1841 births
1928 deaths
19th-century Roman Catholic bishops in Scotland
20th-century Roman Catholic archbishops in Scotland
Roman Catholic archbishops of St Andrews and Edinburgh
Clergy from Edinburgh
Bishops of Dunkeld (Roman Catholic, Post-Reformation)
Scottish Roman Catholic bishops